David Stuart Erskine, 13th Earl of Buchan DL (6 November 1815 – 3 December 1899), was an army officer, jockey and the son of Henry Erskine, 12th Earl of Buchan and Elizabeth Cole Shipley, daughter of Major-General Sir Charles Shipley.

Career
Erskine, whilst still Lord Cardross, entered the 35th (Royal Sussex) Regiment of Foot and rose to the rank of Captain. He succeeded his father on his death in 1857 and was appointed Deputy lieutenant of Linlithgow.

Personal life
Erskine married Agnes Graham Smith, daughter of James Smith of Craigend on 27 April 1849, they had two children together:
 Shipley Gordon Stuart Erskine, 14th Earl of Buchan (1850-1934)
 Hon. Albany Mar Stuart Erskine (1852-1933)

Agnes Smith died in 1875 and Lord Buchan remarried on 17 July 1876 to Maria James, daughter of Lt Col William James, eldest son and heir of Charles James, Count of Arran and aunt to Canon Mark James.

Erskine lived at West Hagbourne Manor, Didcot in Oxfordshire. He was declared bankrupt in 1894 at the sum of £388 after having passed on his estates in Linlithgow to his son, Lord Cardross, later the 14th Earl of Buchan.

Erskine died aged 83 on 3 December 1898, before his death he had converted to Roman Catholicism.

References

External links
 Who's Who: 13th Earl of, cr 1469 (David Stuart Erskine)

David Erskine
1815 births
1899 deaths
Converts to Roman Catholicism